Fellow Hoodlums is the third studio album by the Scottish rock band Deacon Blue, released in 1991. It includes four singles: "Your Swaying Arms", the Top 10 hit "Twist and Shout", "Closing Time" and "Cover from the Sky".

It reached no. 2 in the UK Albums Chart in 1991, spending over six months in the listing.

Critical reception
The Washington Post wrote: "Unfortunately, no visceral emotions come through the music -- the singing is too bland, the playing is too safe and the sentiments are too predictable. The result is the kind of middle-brow artsiness favored by Sting and Joe Jackson; the listener can believe that something serious is going on without actually being challenged in any way."

Track listing
All songs written by Ricky Ross, except where noted:
 "James Joyce Soles" – 3:50
 "Fellow Hoodlums" – 3:20
 "Your Swaying Arms" – 4:10
 "Cover from the Sky" – 3:34
 "The Day that Jackie Jumped the Jail" – 3:42
 "The Wildness" (Ross, Prime) – 5:42
 "A Brighter Star than You Will Shine" (Ross, Prime) – 4:32
 "Twist and Shout" – 3:34
 "Closing Time" – 6:10
 "Goodnight Jamsie" (Ross, Prime) – 1:47
 "I Will See You Tomorrow" (Ross, Prime) – 3:20
 "One Day I'll Go Walking" (Ross, McIntosh) –  5:00

2012 Reissue

On 22 October 2012, Edsel Records released a deluxe remastered edition of the album, featuring a bonus CD of material and a DVD containing videos.

Personnel
Ricky Ross – vocals, guitar, piano, keyboard
Lorraine McIntosh – vocal
James Prime – keyboard
Ewen Vernal – bass
Graeme Kelling – guitar
Dougie Vipond – drums

References

1991 albums
Albums produced by Jon Kelly
Deacon Blue albums
Columbia Records albums